Umesh Dubey (born 10 December 1962) is an Indian cricket umpire. He has stood in 1999–00 Ranji Trophy game. He has also stood in Road Safety World Series.

References

1962 births
Living people
Indian cricket umpires
Cricketers from Mumbai